Bjørn Morten Hofmann (born in Oslo, 20 July 1964) is a Norwegian researcher in philosophy of medicine and ethics with special interest for the relationship between epistemology and ethics.

His main subjects in the philosophy of medicine have been the concepts of health and disease. In the philosophy of the health sciences he has studied causation, rationality, evidence, diagnosis, overdiagnosis, medicalization and futility. Reproductive technologies, biobanks and organ transplantation have been his main topics in the ethics of biotechnologies. Additionally, Hofmann has published in research ethics, ethics in health technology assessment (HTA), medical ethics, health services research, and science and technology studies.

Education and professional career 
Hofmann was trained in the natural sciences at the Norwegian University of Science and Technology (Norges Tekniske Høgskole) where he studied physical electronics and biomedical engineering and graduated in 1989. After his studies he worked with medical technology at Lillehammer county hospital and with health applications at Telenor Research. He studied philosophy at the University of Tromsø in 1993 and 1994 and got his PhD in philosophy of medicine from the University of Oslo in 2002.

Hofmann has been working as a professor at the University College of Gjøvik, the Norwegian University of Science and Technology at Gjøvik, and at the University of Oslo and has been a researcher at the Norwegian Knowledge Centre for the Health Services since 2002. Hofmann was a Harkness fellow at the Dartmouth College in the United States, 2014–2015.

Publications

Books 

 Hofmann B, Oftestad E, Magelssen M. Hva vil vi med fosterdiagnostikk? Fosterdiagnostikkens etikk. [On the ethics of prenatal testing.] Oslo:Cappelen Damm, 2021
 Hofmann B. Hva er sykdom? What is disease? Gyldendal Akademisk, 2008, 2014.
 Solbakk JH, Holm S, Hofmann B. The Ethics of Research Biobanking. Dordrecht Heidelberg London New York: Springer 2009 363 s
 Hofmann B. Infusjonsapparatur. Oslo: Universitetsforlaget, 1998. [Infusion Devices. Oslo: Scandinavian University Press, 1998]

Recent journal articles 
Recent journal articles

Citation 
63 of his papers and journal articles have been cited 20 times or more, according to Google Scholar (2021).
His most cited papers  are:
Hofmann, B. "On the triad disease, illness and sickness". Journal of Medicine and Philosophy 2002; 27 (6): 651-674
Hofmann, B. "Toward a procedure for integrating moral issues in health technology assessment."  International Journal of Technology Assessment in Health Care 2005;21(3):312-18.
Hofmann, B. "Broadening consent and diluting ethics." Journal of Medical Ethics 2009; 35(2): 125–129. 
Hofmann, B. "Is there a technological imperative in health care?" International Journal of Technology Assessment in Health Care 2002; 18(3): 675–689.

References

Sources 
 Bergstrøm, Ida (31. mai 2013) «Professor pipelort». In: På Høyden (Norwegian)
 Hofmann, Bjørn (2004)«Hva er sykdom?» In: Sykepleien, nr. 2 (Norwegian)
 Hofmann's profile pages at UiO and NTNU (English)

External links 
 Hofmann's profile page, University of Oslo (accessed on 3 September 2015)
 Hofmann's profile page, NTNU (accessed on 8 January 2021)

Academic staff of the Norwegian University of Science and Technology
Academics from Oslo
Living people
1964 births
20th-century Norwegian scientists
21st-century Norwegian scientists
20th-century Norwegian educators
21st-century Norwegian educators